The 2016 NCAA Division I Cross Country Championships were the 78th NCAA Men's Division I Cross Country Championship and the 36th NCAA Women's Division I Cross Country Championship to determine the national champions of men's and women's NCAA Division I collegiate cross country running. They were hosted by Indiana State University at the LaVern Gibson Cross Country Course in Terre Haute, Indiana on November 19, 2016. Four different championships will be contested: men's and women's individual and team championships.

Women's title
Distance: 6,000 meters
(DC) = Defending champions

Women's Team Result (Top 10)

Women's Individual Result (Top 10)

Men's title
Distance: 10,000 meters
(DC) = Defending champions

Men's Team Result (Top 10)

Men's Individual Result (Top 10)

See also
 NCAA Men's Division II Cross Country Championship 
 NCAA Women's Division II Cross Country Championship 
 NCAA Men's Division III Cross Country Championship 
 NCAA Women's Division III Cross Country Championship

References
 

NCAA Cross Country Championships
NCAA Division I Cross Country Championships
NCAA Division I Cross Country Championships
Terre Haute, Indiana
Track and field in Indiana
NCAA Division I Cross Country Championships
Indiana State University